Gordion Museum is a museum in Turkey.

Location
Unlike most other museums this museum is located in a village. The village is founded next to Gordion, the capital of Phrygia an ancient kingdom in Anatolia.

History
Recently, the museum was enlarged by adding a  stock room, a  additional exhibition hall a lab and  conference room. There is also a  open air exhibition area.

Exhibits
The exhibits include the Phrygian and other archaeological items, especially those of King Midas. There is also a chronological exhibition of later artifacts including Hellenistic and Roman Empire items and also a coinage section.

There are many tumuli around Gordion. They are actually the tombs of Phrygian aristocrats. The most important tumulus with a   diameter and  height belongs to King Midas.  It was unearthed in 1957 and after underpinning works it was opened to visits.

Gallery

References

Buildings and structures in Ankara Province
Polatlı
Museums in Turkey
1963 establishments in Turkey